Elizabeth Addo (born 1 September 1993) is a Ghanaian footballer who plays as a forward for Djurgårdens IF of the Swedish Damallsvenskan. She is also the captain of the Ghana women's national football team.

Club career
Addo began her career in Ghana, playing for Tesano Ladies F.C. in 2003 and later signed for Athleta Ladies F.C locally known as "Ashaiman Ladies" based in Ashaiman in the year 2007–2012. She spent couple of seasons there and later joined Nigerian giant side Rivers Angels F.C. from 2012 to 2014. Her performance helped the team win the 2012/2013 Nigerian Women Football League and 2013/2014 Nigerian Women Football League under Rivers Angels F.C. Manager Edwin Okon. The Port Harcourt women, doubled the lead in the 56th minute after a beautiful inter-play in Amazon's 18-yard box was scored by Addo.

Addo returned to Ghana in 2014 and later joined ŽFK Spartak Subotica in Serbia the same year.

Ferencvárosi TC, 2015
In 2015, Addo moved back to Europe and joined Hungarian giant Ferencvárosi TC in Budapest Hungary. She was an integral part of the first team under manager Balázs Dörnyei and won the 2015/2016 Hungarian Női NB I league title and Hungarian Women's Cup in 2016.

Addo was considered one of the team's top three players. She played 27 league matches and scored 17 goals helping her team winning the Hungarian Női NB I League title. She scored the equalizing goal in the 89th minute against rival MTK which turned the score line Ferencvárosi TC 1 – 1 MTK. Her equalizing goal helped her club qualify for the Hungarian FA Cup finals on penalties. She played the full 90 minutes for her side to defeat Honved 5–0 in the finals.

Addo played for Club Ferencváros in the 2015–16 UEFA Women's Champions League and placed second during the group stage. In 2016, Addo was one of three players shortlisted for the 2015/2016 Női NB I Women Footballer of the Year award.

Kvarnsvedens IK, 2016–2017
In August 2016, Damallsvenskan League side Kvarnsvedens IK signed Addo who had joined the club on a free transfer. Addo has been very impressive in the Sweden Damallsvenskan league, So far she played 8 games scored 5 goals for Kvarnsvedens IK( Played as a center midfielder in the 7 Damallsvenskan league games and scored 1, assist 2 goals, created 2 penalties in each game and scored 4 goal in the Sweden FA Cup. She had her name marked in the Sweden Damallsvenskan Best XII of the month of September 2016.

Seattle Reign, 2018
Addo had signed a contract to join the Boston Breakers in the NWSL, however the Breakers folded ahead of the 2018 season. She was chosen by the Seattle Reign in the Dispersal Draft with the 8th pick.

Western Sydney Wanderers, 2018 (loan)
On 11 October 2018, Addo was signed on loan to the Western Sydney Wanderers for the W-League 2018–2019 season.

Jiangsu Suning
In April 2019, Chinese Women's Super League side Jiangsu Suning signed her on a 1-year deal after parting ways with Seattle Reign after her contract ended where she joined her former teammate, Tabitha Chawinga at Swedish club Kvarnsvedens. Her stay with the club ended faster than it should unfortunately due to the COVID-19 pandemic in 2020. Whilst at the club she played 14 matches, scored 5 times and made 10 assists. Within that short stint with the club she won 4 trophies, The Chinese Women's Super League, Women's FA Cup, FA Tournament and the Women's Super Cup. Addo was a core part of the team that placed 2nd in the maiden AFC Women's Club Championship in her debut season.

Apollon Ladies
After playing for one year in the Chinese Women's Super League Addo, signed for Cypriot top-flight side Apollon Ladies FC in 2020.  Addo made her debut for Cyprus side Apollon Ladies FC on 4 November 2020 in their 3–0 win over Swansea Ladies in the UEFA Women's Champions League first qualifying round.

North Carolina Courage, 2021–
On 18 January 2021, Addo returned to the United States following a move to National Women's Soccer League club North Carolina Courage on a one-year deal, with an option of a 12-month extension.

International career

Youth team
Addo has been a full international for Ghana since 2007. At the age of 14, she starred with the under-14 national team at the 2007 FIFA U-14 Women's World Cup held in Switzerland and captained the team to finals and eventually the championship .

She captained Ghana at the 2008 FIFA U-17 Women's World Cup held in New Zealand and was the deputy captain for Ghana's U17 female team (Black Maidens) at the 2010 2010 FIFA U-17 Women's World Cup. Addo was part of the national team which competed in the 2010 FIFA U-20 Women's World Cup held in Germany and competed at the 2012 FIFA U-20 Women's World Cup held in Japan.

Senior team
She was also part of the national team which competed in the 2014 African Women's Championship qualification.

She was among Ghana Squared which faced Cameroon for 2016 Rio Olympic Games qualifier at Accra Sports Stadium -Ghana She played in a friendly match against Germany on 22 July 2016. 12 April 2016, she played a key role in Ghana qualifying for the 2016 Africa Women Cup of Nations. She led the Ghanaian team as captain to the Third place position in the 2016 Africa Women Cup of Nations. She won two man of the matches awards and scored 3 goals in the Tournament to finish as the 3rd top scorer and the top scorer for the Ghanaian team. Due to her exploits at the tournament she was named in the Team of the Tournament. She was part of the Ghanaian team to the 2018 Africa Women Cup of Nations hosted in Ghana. In March 2020, she was part of the Ghanaian team that participated in the 2020 Turkish Women's Cup which is an annual invitational women's football tournament played in Turkey. She led the team to finish 2nd in their group whilst placing 3rd overall in the competition to win the bronze medal and a trophy.

International goals

Honours
Rivers Angels

 Nigeria Women Premier League: 2014
 Aiteo Cup: 2013, 2014
Ferencváros
 Női NB I: 2015–16
 Nöi Magyar Kupa: 2015–16
Jiangsu Suning
 Chinese Women's Super League: 2019
Chinese Women's FA Cup: 2019
Chinese Women's FA Tournament: 2019
Chinese Women's Super cup: 2019
AFC Women's Club Championship runners-up: 2019
Ghana
 Africa Women Cup of Nations third-place: 2016
Turkish Women's Cup third-place: 2020
Individual
 Africa Women Cup of Nations 2016: Best XI
 Ghana Women's Footballer of the Year: 2019
Africa Women's Player of the Year 2016: Top 3
 Africa Women's Player of the Year 2018: Top 10
 Africa Women's Player of the Year 2019: Top 10
 IFFHS CAF Woman Team of the Decade 2011–2020

See also
List of Ghana women's international footballers

References

External links
 
 
 

1993 births
Living people
Ghanaian women's footballers
Ghana women's international footballers
ŽFK Spartak Subotica players
Rivers Angels F.C. players
Kvarnsvedens IK players
National Women's Soccer League players
OL Reign players
Women's association football forwards
Ghanaian expatriate sportspeople in the United States
Expatriate footballers in Nigeria Women Premier League
Ghanaian expatriate women's footballers
Saudi Women's Premier League players